Cape Town Street Circuit is a  street circuit laid out on the city streets of Cape Town, South Africa. It hosts the Cape Town ePrix from 2023 Formula E season.

History

The track was initially planned to be included in the 2022 Formula E calendar, however the race was cancelled.

When the provisional calendar of 2023 Formula E season was announced firstly, the circuit was not officially listed on the calendar and was considered to be added in. Following the approval of FIA World Motor Sport Council in October 2022, the circuit was officially listed on the 2023 Formula E calendar.

Layout

On 4 March 2022, the track layout was revealed, which will be will be located in Cape Town's Waterfront district, around the Cape Town Stadium. It is believed that the track would be the one of the fastest circuits on the calendar.

References

External links 
Official website

Cape Town
Cape Town
Sports venues in Cape Town
Cape Town ePrix